Ceobred (or Ceolred) was a medieval Bishop of Leicester.

Ceobred was consecrated between December 840 and 844. He died between 869 and 888. In 844, he gave land at Pangbourne on the Thames River to Berhtwulf, king of Mercia, in return for a grant of liberties for some monasteries.

Citations

References

External links
 

Bishops of Leicester (ancient)
9th-century English bishops